Mersa (Amharic: መርሳ) also known as Mersa-Abagetye  (Amharic፡ መርሳ አባ ጌትየ)is a city administration in Habru Woreda of the Semien Wollo (North Wollo) of the Amhara Region (or kilil) in Ethiopia. The city it is the administrative center of Habru Woreda. Mersa is located along Ethiopian Highway 2.

Mersa was a victim of rocket attack by Derg at the beginning of 1990. Jenny Hamond described the incident as: "It was the site of a terrible atrocity by the retreating Derg forces as the Front fighters closed in on them in 1990. They retreated to a safe distance and then they turned their heavy BM rocket launchers onto the defenseless town."

References

Populated places in the Amhara Region